The Harrisburg Heat is an American professional indoor soccer team based in Harrisburg, Pennsylvania. The team is a part of the Major Arena Soccer League. The Heat's home venue is New Holland Arena at the Pennsylvania Farm Show Complex & Expo Center.

The Harrisburg Heat claim the heritage of an original Harrisburg Heat franchise that was a member of the National Professional Soccer League, which later became the Major Indoor Soccer League. On May 2, 2012, the Heat were awarded a PASL expansion franchise to begin with the 2012–13 season.

On January 24, 2014, the Heat announced they would relocate from the 2,200-seat Equine Arena at the Pennsylvania Farm Show Complex & Expo Center to the complex's 7,300-seat New Holland Arena (originally called the "Large Arena") starting with the 2014–15 season. The original Harrisburg Heat played their home matches at the Large Arena during their 12 seasons of existence.  The team was scheduled to join the Indoor Professional League in 2016, but it was later announced that they had rejoined the MASL.

Ownership

The Heat was sold by the PASL in September 2013 and was owned and operated by the Heat Soccer Group LLC with longtime indoor soccer broadcaster John Wilsbach the principal owner. Wilsbach served as the President and General Manager.

Richard Chinapoo served as the team's head coach the first two seasons before retiring and being replaced by onetime indoor soccer star Tarik Walker, who was fired after an 0-13 start in the 2015-16 season. Gino DiFlorio longtime assistant coach, served as interim head co-coach with Mark Ludwig for the remainder of the season, with a 1-5 record.

Carl Delmont purchased the team in June 2016 from John Wilsbach, and is the CEO and general manager. Wilsbach remains with the team as the vice president of broadcasting. Denison Cabral was named head coach of the Heat for the  2016-17 season and stepped down after the 2017-18 season.

Players

2019–20 roster

Active players

Inactive players

Staff
  Pat Healey – Head coach
  Tom Mellor – Assistant coach

Notable former players
  Stephen Basso
  Douglas dos Santos
  Darvin Ebanks
  Lucio Gonzaga
  Alex Mendoza
  Youssef Naciri
  Nick Noble
  Yaikel Pérez
  Val Teixeira

Year-by-year

Playoffs

References

External links
Harrisburg Heat official website

2012 establishments in Pennsylvania
Association football clubs established in 2012
Indoor soccer clubs in the United States
Major Arena Soccer League teams
Soccer clubs in Pennsylvania
Professional Arena Soccer League teams
Sports in Harrisburg, Pennsylvania